"Have a Nice Day" is the second single from rock band the Stereophonics taken from their third album Just Enough Education to Perform (2001). Written by Kelly Jones and produced by Bird and Bush, it was released on 11 June 2001. The song received negative reviews but reached number five on the UK Singles Chart and went on to become one of the band's biggest hits. It also found success worldwide, reaching number 11 in Ireland, number 37 in New Zealand, and becoming Stereophonics' first song to appear on a US Billboard chart.

Background and release
The lyrics for "Have a Nice Day" are based on a cab fare Stereophonics took in San Francisco Bay when they were touring in the United States. When the band got in the back of the cab the driver said to them, "I hate this place, it's full of tourists and processed fish". He explained to the trio that he was a poet who believes everyone in the world are alike; the only difference is the accents. At the end of the journey the driver ended the conversation with: "That'll be seven bucks, have a nice day". After the cab journey, lead singer and guitarist Kelly Jones took the conversation and placed it into the lyrics.

Jones later put the words and music together in October 1999 in a hotel in Europe. The song was first released on Just Enough Education to Perform on 17 April 2001. It was later released as the album's second single on 11 June 2001. The song was also included in the band's first greatest hits compilation album, Decade in the Sun: Best of Stereophonics.

Music video
The first video for "Have a Nice Day" was directed by Jake & Jim, it features the band along with their touring musician Tony Kirkham on keyboard and twenty-one models. Throughout the video Kelly Jones is tied to a blue and white target with balloons round his wrists and ankles.

The treatment was written by Kelly Jones, who was trying to do a mix between Jimi Hendrix's Electric Ladyland album cover and the Clint Eastwood film Bronco Billy though when he went to the set and saw the half-naked models with glitter he ended up feeling like Les Dawson.

Reception

Critical response
"Have a Nice Day" received negative reviews from music critics. When reviewing the album, John Dark from Drowned in Sound said it "has more sap than a Vermont maple." He was also critical of the song's narrative structure and signature line: "ba-ba-ba's". NME summarised the song as a "beige smudge of a song".

Chart performance
"Have a Nice Day" debuted at number five on the UK Singles Chart, making it the band's fifth single to chart in the top five and it remained in the charts for nine weeks. In 2020, the British Phonographic Industry awarded the song with a Platinum certification. On the Irish Singles Chart the single peaked at number five and remained in the charts for eleven weeks.

In New Zealand, the song debuted at number 42 on 5 August 2001 before reaching number 37 the following week and remained in the chart for four weeks. The song appeared in the Dutch Top 40 charts on 16 June 2001 at number 95, it ascended to number 87 for the next two weeks until it reached its peak position at number 84. It remained in the charts for the next six weeks until it dropped out. In the United States, "Have a Nice Day" is the only Stereophonics single to chart on the Billboard Adult Top 40, peaking at number 26.

Track listings

Credits and personnel
Credits are taken from the Just Enough Education to Perform album booklet.

Studios
 Recorded at Real World Studios (Bath, Somerset, England) and Monnow Valley Studios (Rockfield, Wales)
 Mixed at Soundtrack Studios (New York City)
 Mastered at Gateway Mastering (Portland, Maine, US)

Stereophonics
 Kelly Jones – vocals, guitar
 Richard Jones – bass
 Stuart Cable – drums

Additional personnel
 Marshall Bird – piano, backing vocals, Wurlitzer
 Bird and Bush – production, engineering
 Andy Wallace – mixing
 Bob Ludwig –mastering

Charts and certifications

Weekly charts

Year-end charts

Certifications

Release history

Appearances in media
"Have a Nice Day" was briefly used in Dawn of the Dead, in an episode of The Naked Chef and in the Veronica Mars episode "Drinking the Kool-Aid". It was also included in the 2002 Roswell TV soundtrack. The song plays in Black Mirror episode  Shut Up and Dance.

References

External links
 Have a Nice Day at Stereophonics.com

2001 singles
2001 songs
Songs written by Kelly Jones
Stereophonics songs
UK Independent Singles Chart number-one singles
V2 Records singles